MSTelcom is a subsidiary of Sonangol Group, the state petroleum company of Angola.  MSTelcom provides a range of telecommunications services for the oil industry as well as for residential and corporate clients.  Its name comes from "Mercury Telecommunication Services SARL". Its competitors include Angola Telecom.

Operations
 TCC The company's hub is the TCC, or Telecommunications Center, located in Luanda, the capital of Angola.
 Telephony MSTelcom provides a countrywide landline network with international access, wireless local loop DECT coverage, and VSAT satellite service for corporate clients.
 Data The company provides corporate data transmission services.
 Internet MSTelcom is an end user Internet Service Provider with corporate and residential customers.
 Microwave Network The company provides medium and high microwave bandwidth corporate networks. 
 Radio MSTelcom provides a national and international voice and data radio communications system, a maritime VHF network, an aeronautical VHF network, a community ground UHF radio repeater network, and a radio trunking system.

Telecommunications companies of Angola